Jake William Bennett (born 22 February 1996) is an English footballer who plays for  side Coalville Town, where he plays as a defender.

Playing career

Sheffield United
Bennett made his debut for Sheffield United on 9 August 2017 in an EFL Cup fixture at home to Walsall which the home side won 2–1, Jake played for 58 minutes before being replaced by Chris Basham.

Alfreton Town
Following his departure from Sheffield United, Jake joined National League North side Alfreton Town on 11 October 2019.

Coalville Town
On 10 December 2019, Jake was confirmed as signing for Southern League Premier Division Central side Coalville Town.

Personal life
Jake is the cousin of fellow footballers Elliott Bennett and Kyle Bennett.

References

External links

1996 births
Living people
English footballers
Association football defenders
AFC Telford United players
Market Drayton Town F.C. players
Mickleover Sports F.C. players
Sheffield United F.C. players
Chesterfield F.C. players
Alfreton Town F.C. players
Coalville Town F.C. players